Padstow railway station may refer to:

Padstow railway station (England) in Cornwall, England
Padstow railway station, Sydney in Australia